Shepherd is an unincorporated community in Perry Township, Boone County, in the U.S. state of Indiana.

History
A post office was established at Shepherd in 1886, and remained in operation until it was discontinued in 1901.

Geography

References

Unincorporated communities in Boone County, Indiana
Unincorporated communities in Indiana
Indianapolis metropolitan area